"You Sang to Me" is a 2000 hit song by Marc Anthony, and was released as the third single of his first English language album, Marc Anthony.

Song information
The song was written and produced by Marc Anthony and Cory Rooney, and like the previous English single from Marc Anthony also a Spanish version was recorded, but wasn't included on the first edition of the album. Both versions of the track were very successful in the United States. The English version peaked at even higher than "I Need to Know", climbing to No. 2 on the Billboard Hot 100. It also spent seven weeks at No. 1 on the Billboard adult contemporary chart. The Spanish version ("Muy Dentro de Mi") hit No. 1 on the Hot Latin Tracks chart for 3 consecutive weeks. According to Anthony, he wrote this song for his then-friend Jennifer Lopez, whom he married soon after. This version was nominated for a Lo Nuestro Award for Pop Song of the Year, losing to "A Puro Dolor" by Son by Four.

The English-language version of the track received a nomination for a Grammy Award for Best Male Pop Vocal Performance, the second year in a row for Marc Anthony, losing once again to Sting with "She Walks This Earth (Soberana Rosa)", a collaboration for the album A Love Affair: The music of Ivan Lins.

"You Sang to Me" was included on the compilation album pLATINum rhythm, released on October 30, 2001, by Maverick Música. It is also included on the movie soundtrack for the 1999 hit movie Runaway Bride, winning an ASCAP award in the field "Most Performed Songs from Motion Pictures"  for this collaboration.

Critical reception
On the Entertainment Weekly's Chart Flashback by Raymond Fiore, posted on May 23, 2006, analyzing the Billboard Hot 100 chart of May 27, 2000, he gave the single a "B+" grade:

{{cquote|I'd argue that Anthony is this decade's Steve Perry — a technical, earnest, and highly emotive tenor who's always testing our schmaltz threshold. I'd also argue that until the salsero fully translates the passionate intensity of his Spanish work, this will remain his single most heartfelt English-language moment."|30px|30px|}}

Music video
The music video for this single was directed by Jeff Richter, and starred Australian model Kristy Hinze as Anthony's love interest.

Track listing

CD Single No. 1 (B00004TLLU) 
You Sang to Me (Remix Radio Edit)
You Sang to Me (Radio Edit)
Muy Dentro de Mí (You Sang To Me) (Radio Edit No. 2)
I Need to Know (Pablo Flores Miami Mix)

CD Single No. 2 (B00004TBX3) 
You Sang to Me (Remix)
You Sang to Me (Remix Radio Edit)
You Sang to Me (Album Version)
Muy Dentro de Mí (You Sang to Me) (Spanish)
Muy Dentro de Mí (You Sang to Me) (Spanglish)

Chart performance
The single entered the Billboard'' Hot 100 chart at number 77 in the week of February 26, 2000, climbing to the Top Ten (at number 5) 14 weeks later, and peaking at number 2 for two weeks. The single spent 6 weeks in the Top 10 and 32 weeks total in that chart and ranked at number 22 on the Year-End Chart of 2000, while his own single "I Need to Know" ranked at number 23.

"Muy Dentro de Mí", the Spanish version of the song, debuted on the Hot Latin Tracks chart on April 22, 2000, at number 37, climbing to Top Ten eight weeks later and to pole position from July 1, 2000, to July 15, 2000. The single became his fourth chart topper in the Latin Market and spent 16 weeks within the Top 10 and 26 weeks total in the chart.

Weekly charts

Year-end charts

Decade-end charts

Certifications

See also
Billboard Top Latin Songs Year-End Chart
List of Billboard Adult Contemporary number ones of 2000
List of number-one Billboard Hot Latin Tracks of 2000
List of number-one Billboard Hot Latin Pop Airplay of 2000
List of number-one Billboard Latin Tropical Airplay of 2000

References

2000 singles
Marc Anthony songs
Music videos directed by Jeff Richter
Pop ballads
Songs written by Cory Rooney
Songs written by Marc Anthony
Columbia Records singles
1999 songs